Stethoperma duodilloni is a species of beetle in the family Cerambycidae. It was described by E. Forrest Gilmour in 1950. It is known from Brazil.

References

Onciderini
Beetles described in 1950